Ballaugh Station (Manx: Stashoon Raad Yiarn Valley Ny Loghey) was a mandatory stopping place on the Manx Northern Railway  that ran between St. John's and Ramsey in the Isle of Man. It opened when the line was opened and was later owned and operated by the Isle of Man Railway; it served the village of Ballaugh.

Description
The building was erected for the opening of the railway although there is now little sign of it on the site; the station building itself was of similar construction to the ones at both Kirk Michael and Sulby Bridge but was demolished some time after the railway closed. The station was opened in 1879 and remained open until the railway closed in 1968. Although the station building has been demolished the large stone-built goods shed remains, as does the goods platform, the former being under the care of the local heritage trust which periodically opens the shed to display a variety of railway items including railwayana and former signage which was once displayed at the station from private collections.  A private bungalow now stands on the site of the station building.

Location
The line itself crossed the main road from the village to Jurby - Station Road - and on the northerly side there was once a modest goods yard, cattle dock and siding. The raised cattle dock is still visible along with a goods shed. Today the disused line is grassed over and is a popular footpath extending as far as Kirk Michael in the west and Lezayre in the east.  The walking of dogs along this footpath is prohibited.

Route

See also
 Isle of Man Railway stations
 Manx Northern Railway
 Ballaugh

References

Sources
 [Isle of Man Steam Railway Supporters' Association]

Subterranea Britannica - Ballaugh Station

Railway stations in the Isle of Man
Railway stations opened in 1879
Railway stations closed in 1968